The Adriatic Charter is an association formed by Albania, Croatia, North Macedonia and the United States for the purpose of aiding their attempts to join NATO. The Charter was signed on 2 May 2003 in Tirana under the aegis of the United States. The role of the United States has caused some confusion; in discussions in the other member states, the Charter is often called the U.S.-Adriatic Charter. In September 2008 Montenegro and Bosnia and Herzegovina were invited to join the Charter and joined on December 4, 2008. Serbia accepted observer status at the same time. On 1 April, 2009, Albania and Croatia became the first of the group to join NATO. On 5 June, 2017, Montenegro joined NATO. On 27 March, 2020, North Macedonia joined NATO.

Members
Joined 2003
 (NATO member since 2009)
 (NATO member since 2009)
 (NATO member since 2020)
 (NATO founder)

Joined 2008

 (NATO member since 2017)

Observers
Since 2008

Since 2012
 (2012 applied for Adriatic Charter membership)

See also
Vilnius Group - a similar association of NATO-aspirant countries.

Notes and references
Notes:

References:

Organizations established in 2003
Adriatic Sea
Balkans
NATO treaties
2003 in international relations